Hardtberg (Ripuarian: Hardtbersch) is a borough (Stadtbezirk) of Bonn, Germany. It has a population of 34,576 (2018).

Twin towns – sister cities

Hardtberg is twinned with:
 Villemomble, France (1967)

References

Urban districts and boroughs of Bonn